The 2013 Grambling State Tigers football team represented Grambling State University in the 2013 NCAA Division I FCS football season. The Tigers were led by head coach Doug Williams in the third season of his second tenure as head coach and ninth overall after coaching the Tigers from 1998 to 2003. They competed as a member of the West Division of the Southwestern Athletic Conference (SWAC) and played their home games at Eddie Robinson Stadium in Grambling, Louisiana. The Tigers finished the season with a  record.

Head coach Doug Williams' contract was bought out after the first two games of the season. He was replaced by interim head coach George Ragsdale, the team's running backs coach. Ragsdale was subsequently fired on October 17 after losing five games in a row and replaced with Dennis Winston as interim head coach. In response to a number of players being dissatisfied with the conditions of the facility and practices of the athletic department, Grambling State refused to play the October 19 game against Jackson State University. As such, their game against the Tigers was forfeited. On October 22, the players officially ended their boycott, and the team returned to the field for their next game against Texas Southern University.

On December 4, 2013, Broderick Fobbs was introduced as Winston's replacement as full-time head coach of the Tigers.

Schedule

 October 19's game against Jackson State was forfeited due to Grambling State players refusing to travel to Jackson State.

References

Grambling State
Grambling State Tigers football seasons
College football controversies
Grambling State Tigers football